The Druk Thuendrel Tshogpa (DTT; , , also 'Unity Party of Bhutan') is a political party in Bhutan. It was founded in 2022 by Kinga Tshering, a former North Thimphu member of parliament for the DPT.

References

Political parties in Bhutan
Political parties established in 2022